Ghana Post (also known as Ghana Post Company Limited) is a government-owned corporation responsible for postal service in Ghana and a member of the West African Postal Conference.

The current Managing Director is Bice Osei Kuffour, popularly known as Obour with Kwaku Tabi Amponsah as his deputy. He succeeded James Kwofie as the Managing Director.

History
Historically, Ghana Post commenced business in 1854 as the Post and Telecommunications Department of the Colonial Administration. It was transformed into a corporation in 1974 with the promulgation of the NRC Decree 311 of 1974. The Telecommunications Division was carved out of the corporation in 1993, leaving the Postal Division to be renamed the Ghana Postal Services Corporation, its enabling act being Act 505 of 1995. The corporation was later incorporated under the Companies' Code (Act 179) in 1995 in line with the enactment of the Statutory Corporations (Conversion To Companies) Act 1993, Act 461; which required some state-owned enterprises to become limited liability companies; hence its current name Ghana Post Company Limited.

The company has legal monopoly over the provision of the universal postal service; letters below 100 grams.

The company provides postal, courier, retail, agency and financial services for its customers for profit.

Management 
The Ghana Post Company Limited is managed by a seven-member Board of Directors. People on the board are;

 George Afedzi Hayford (Chairman), 
 Bice Osei Kuffour (Managing Director), 
 Yiadom Boakye Kessie (Member), 
 Abena Durowaa Mensah (Member), 
 Frederick Akuffo-Gyimah (Member), 
 Alfred Nii-Nortey Nortey (Member), and 
 Michael Omari Wadie (Member).

Awards 
Some awards garnered include;

 Best EMS Call Centre 2017 by the Universal Postal Union in Switzerland,
 Best Customer Care Award 2018 by the Universal Postal Union in Switzerland,
 Public Sector Campaign of the Year 2018 by the Marketing World Awards, 
 CIMG President Special Awards 2018 by Chartered Institute of Marketing Ghana (CIMG),
 Most Reliable and Fastest Courier Company in West Africa 2019 by Pillars Modern Ghana Awards,
 Excellence in Innovation and Technology 2019 by Ghana Shippers Awards,
 Outstanding Contribution to the Shipping Industry 2019 by Ghana Shippers Awards.

References

External links 
 

Postal system of Ghana
Philately of Ghana
Service companies of Ghana
Companies based in Accra